Kirsten Green (born 1971/1972) is an American venture capitalist, the founder and managing partner of Forerunner Ventures.

Early life 
Green was born and raised outside of San Francisco, California. She attended the University of California Los Angeles, where she obtained a degree in business economics.

Career 
Following her studies at UCLA, Green worked as a stock analyst for Montgomery Securities covering retailers. For several years, she worked as an angel investor and independent consultant before founding San Francisco-based Forerunner Ventures in 2010, where she is also the managing director.

On August 14, 2020, Daily Front Row listed Green as one of a group of high profile investors who purchased W magazine, a troubled fashion magazine.

Honors and recognition 
Green was listed in the Forbes list of The World's 100 Most Powerful Women in 2017, 2018, 2019, and 2020, with ranks of 95, 89, 95, and 95, respectively.

She was included in Time's 100 Most Influential People; named a Top 20 Venture Capitalists by The New York Times in 2017 and 2018; and was on Forbes' 2017 and 2018 Midas Lists.

She was named VC of the Year at TechCrunch's 2017 Crunchies Awards, and listed on Vanity Fair's New Establishment list. Green is a founding member of the female mentorship collective All Raise, and champions women in the tech industry. She gave a SXSW keynote speech on diversity in a male-dominated industry.

Personal life 
Green is married, has two children, and lives in San Francisco.

References

Living people
1970s births
University of California, Los Angeles alumni
American women chief executives
American venture capitalists
American company founders
American women company founders
21st-century American businesspeople
21st-century American women